Rashīd al-Dīn Ṭabīb (‎ 1247–1318; also known as Rashīd al-Dīn Faḍlullāh Hamadānī) was a statesman, historian and physician in Ilkhanate Iran. He was born in 1247 into a Persian Jewish family from Hamadan.

Having converted to Islam by the age of 30 in 1277, Rashid al-Din became the powerful vizier of the Ilkhan, Ghazan. Later he was commissioned by Ghazan to write the Jāmiʿ al-Tawārīkh, now considered the most important single source for the history of the Ilkhanate period and the Mongol Empire. He retained his position as a vizier until 1316.

After being charged with poisoning the Ilkhanid king Öljaitü, he was executed in 1318.

Historian Morris Rossabi calls Rashid al-Din "arguably the most distinguished figure in Persia during Mongolian rule".  He was a prolific author and established the Rab'-e Rashidi academic foundation in Tabriz.

Biography

Rashid al-Din was born into a Persian Jewish family in Hamadan, now in Hamadan Province. His grandfather had been a courtier to the founder of the Ilkhanate, Hulagu Khan, and Rashid al-Din's father was an apothecary at the court. He converted to Islam around the age of thirty.

Rashid was trained as a physician and started service under Hulagu's son, Abaqa Khan. He rose to become the Grand Vizier of the Ilkhanid court at Soltaniyeh, near Qazvin. He served as vizier and physician under the Ilkhans Ghazan and Öljaitü before falling to court intrigues during the reign of Abu Sa'id Bahadur Khan, whose ministers had him killed at the age of seventy. His son, Ghiyas al-Din ibn Rashid al-Din, briefly served as vizier after him.

Jāmiʿ al-Tawārīkh
The Jāmiʿ al-Tawārīkh ("Compendium of Chronicles") was commissioned by Ghazan and initially was a history of the Mongols and their dynasty, but gradually expanded to include the entire history since the time of Adam to Rashid al-Din's time.

Rashid was assisted by Bolad, a Mongol nobleman who was the emissary of the Great Khan to the Ilkhanid court. Bolad provided him with much background about the Mongols.

The Compendium was completed between 1307 and 1316, during the reign of Öljaitü.

Calligraphy workshop: Rab' i-Rashidi
The work was executed at the elaborate scriptorium Rab'-e Rashidi at Qazvin, where a large team of calligraphers and illustrators were employed to produce lavishly illustrated books.  These books could also be copied, while preserving accuracy, using a printing process imported from China.

The work was at the time of completion, of monumental size. Several sections have not survived or been discovered. Portions of the Jāmiʿ al-Tawārīkh survive in lavishly illustrated manuscripts, believed to have been produced during his lifetime and perhaps under his direct supervision at the Rab'-e Rashidi workshop.

Historiographical significance
Volumes I and II of the Jāmiʿ al-Tawārīkh have survived and are of great importance for the study of the Ilkhanate. Volume I "contains the history of the Turkish and Mongol tribes, including their tribal legends, genealogies, myths and the history of the Mongol conquests from the time of Genghis Khan to the end of the reign of Ghazan Khan" while volume II describes "the history of all the peoples with whom the Mongols had fought or with whom they had exchanged embassies". In his narration down to the reign of Möngke Khan (1251–1259), Ata-Malik Juvayni was Rashid al-Din's main source; however, he also utilized numerous now-lost Far Eastern and other sources. The Jāmiʿ al-Tawārīkh is perhaps the single most comprehensive Persian source on the Mongol period. For the period of Genghis Khan, his sources included the now lost Altan Debter ("Golden Book"). His treatment of the Ilkhanid period seems to be biased, as he himself was a high official, yet it is still seen as the most valuable written source for the dynasty.

The third volume is either lost or was never completed; its topic was "historical geography".

The most important historiographic legacy of the Jāmiʿ al-Tawārīkh may be its documentation of the cultural mixing and ensuing dynamism that led to the greatness of the Persian and Ottoman Empires, many aspects of which were transmitted to Europe and influenced the Renaissance. This was the product of the geographical extension of the Mongol Empire, and is most clearly reflected in this work by Rashid al-Din. The text describes the different peoples with whom the Mongols came into contact and is one of the first attempts to transcend a single cultural perspective and to treat history on a universal scale. The Jāmiʿ attempted to provide a history of the whole world of that era, though many parts are lost.

One of the volumes of the Jāmiʿ al-Tawārīkh deals with an extensive History of the Franks (1305/1306), possibly based on information from Europeans working under the Ilkhanates such as Isol the Pisan or the Dominican friars, which is a generally consistent description with many details on Europe's political organization, the use of mappae mundi by Italian mariners and regnal chronologies derived from the chronicle of Martin of Opava (d. 1278).

Book transmission: printing and translation

Rashid al-Din also collected all of his compositions into a single volume, entitled Jami' al-Tasanif al-Rashidi ("The Collected Works of Rashid"), complete with maps and illustrations. He even had some of his shorter works, on medicine and government, translated into Chinese. Anyone who wished was given access to his works and encouraged to copy them. In order to facilitate this, he set aside a fund to pay for the annual transcription of two complete manuscripts of his works, one in Arabic and one in Persian.

The printing process used at the workshop has been described by Rashid al-Din, and bears very strong resemblance to the processes used in the large printing ventures in China under Feng Dao (932–953):

Authorship and plagiarism accusations 

The authorship of the Jāmiʿ al-Tawārīkh has been questioned on several grounds.

Abu al-Qasim Kashani (d. 1324), who wrote the most important extant contemporary source on Öljaitü, maintained that he himself was the true author of the Jāmiʿ al-Tawārīkh, "for which Rashid al-Din had stolen not only the credit but also the very considerable financial rewards."

According to Encyclopædia Iranica, "While there is little reason to doubt Rašid-al-Din’s overall authorship of the Jāmeʿ al-tawāriḵ, the work has generally been considered a collective effort, partly carried out by research assistants." Kashani may have been one of those assistants.

Some also contended that it was a translation of a Mongol original.

Authorship of his Letters

Scholars are in dispute about whether Rashid al-Din's Letters are a forgery or not.  According to David Morgan in The Mongols, Alexander Morton has shown them to be a forgery, probably from the Timurid period. One scholar who has attempted to defend the letters' authenticity is Abolala Soudovar.

Fahlavi poems
There are some fahlavīyāt by him apparently in his native dialect: a hemistich called zabān-e fahlavī (1976, I, p. 290), a quatrain with the appellation bayt-efahlavī, and another hemistich titled zabān-e pahlavī ("Fahlavi language").

Loss of influence and death

In 1312, his colleague Sa'd-al-Din Mohammad Avaji fell from power and was replaced by Taj-al-Din Ali-Shah Jilani. Then, in 1314, Öljaitü died and power passed to his son, Abu Sa'id Bahadur Khan, who sided with Ali-Shah. In 1318, Rashid al-Din was charged with having poisoned Öljaitü and was executed on July 13, at the age of seventy. His Jewish ancestry was referenced numerous times in the court. His head was carried around the city after the execution and people were chanting: "This is the head of the Jew who abused God's name, may God's curse be upon him."

His property was confiscated and Rab'-e Rashidi, with its scriptorium and its precious copies, were turned over to the Mongol soldiery. A century later, during the reign of Timur's son Miran Shah, Rashid al-Din's bones were exhumed from the Muslim cemetery and reburied in the Jewish cemetery.

National and political thoughts
Rashid al-din was an Iranian patriot and also an admirer of the Iranian state traditions. The name of "Iran" is mentioned in his Jami' al-tawarikh, and he showed dislike for Mongols (whom they referred to as Turks).

See also

 List of Muslim historians
 List of Persian scientists and scholars
 Ghiyas al-Din ibn Rashid al-Din, his son

References

Sources

External links

The Mongol siege of Mosul from a manuscript of Rashid Al-Din's Jami' Al-Tawarikh, 14th century
Rashid al-din Hamadani's Illustrated History of the World in digitised book form from the University of Edinburgh

1247 births
1318 deaths
14th-century Iranian physicians
14th-century Iranian historians
13th-century Iranian historians
Ilkhanate historians
Historians of Mongolia
Converts to Islam from Judaism
Medieval Iranian people of Jewish descent
Iranian inventors
Medieval Jewish physicians of Persia
People involved in plagiarism controversies
13th-century Jews
13th-century Iranian physicians
Viziers
People from Hamadan
Executed Iranian people
Executed prime ministers
Mongolists
Turkologists
Viziers of the Ilkhanate
Jews of the Ilkhanate